Morgan Williams (born 28 December 1995) is a Welsh rugby union player who plays at fullback for the Wales rugby sevens team and the Great Britain rugby sevens team. He has previously played at wing and fullback for Scarlets and for Aberavon RFC. His appearances for Wales sevens have included the 2018 Commonwealth Games in Gold Coast and the 2022 Commonwealth Games in Birmingham. He appeared for Great Britain in the 2021 and 2021–22 World Rugby Sevens Series.

Williams was selected for the Wales squad for the 2022 Rugby World Cup Sevens in Cape Town.

References 

Welsh rugby sevens players
1995 births
Living people
People from Caernarfon
Rugby union players from Gwynedd